Lake Dikolongo or Lac Dikilongo is a lake situated in the Democratic Republic of the Congo. It is fed by the Lubudi River. The lake is near Mulumbu, Mukwemba, and Samuzala.

References

Lakes of the Democratic Republic of the Congo